Tangalan, officially the Municipality of Tangalan (Aklanon: Banwa it Tangalan; Hiligaynon: Banwa sang Tangalan), is a 5th class municipality in the province of Aklan, Philippines. According to the 2020 census, it has a population of 23,704 people.

Tangalan was formerly an arrabal of Makato. At the time of its creation, it included the following barrios: Tondog, Jawili, Dumatad, Afga, Baybay, Dapdap, Pudyot, Tagas, Tamalagon, Panayakan, Vivo, Lanipga, Napatag and Tamokoe.

Geography

According to the Philippine Statistics Authority, the municipality has a land area of  constituting  of the  total area of Aklan.

Climate

Barangays
Tangalan is politically subdivided into 15 barangays.

Demographics

In the 2020 census, Tangalan had a population of 23,704.

Economy

Tourism

Tourist spots with government support under "Project Bugna" include Jawili Falls, Jawili Beach Resorts, Dumatad Souvenir Shop, and Bughawi Reforestation Project.

References

External links

 
 [ Philippine Standard Geographic Code]

Municipalities of Aklan